The One That Got Away is an American dating reality television series hosted by singer-songwriter Betty Who. It premiered on Amazon Prime Video on June 24, 2022.

Summary
The series follows six single people searching for their soulmate. It gives them the opportunity to reconnect with their missed connections, as each participant gets to interact with people from their pasts through a device called "The Portal".

Elan Gale serves as showrunner and executive producer, with Caroline Roseman and Gabe Turner also executive producing.

Cast
 Betty Who
 Allyssa Anderson
 Jeffrey Perla
 Ashley Algarin
 Kasey Ma
 Nigel Sydnor
 Vince Xu

Release
The official trailer was released on June 8, 2022. All 10 episodes of the series premiered on Amazon Prime Video on June 24, 2022.

References

External links 
 

2020s American television series
2022 American television series debuts
English-language television shows
Amazon Prime Video original programming
American dating and relationship reality television series
Television series by Amazon Studios